The Center for Research on Programmable Plant Systems (CROPPS) is a trans-disciplinary research center funded by the National Science Foundation to develop systems for two-way communication with plants. The multi-institution program is led by Cornell University with partners at the University of Illinois, Urbana-Champaign, the University of Arizona and the Boyce Thompson Institute. The five-year project launched in 2021 with US$25 million in funding.

Mission 
Its mission is to develop tools to listen and talk to plants and associated organisms that make up their microbiome. The project aims to understand how plants interact and communicate and grow a new field called digital biology.

CROPPS combines research expertise from plant sciences, engineering, computer science, and the social sciences to form an integrated approach to plant biological research and translation.

CROPPS research focus areas:

 Plant innovations
 Plant communications
 Plant systems
 Social and ethical engagement

Leadership 
CROPPS is led by Director Susan McCouch, the Barbara McClintock Professor of Plant Breeding and Genetics at the College of Agriculture and Life Sciences, Cornell University.

The Co-director is Abraham Stroock, the Gordon L. Dibble '50 Professor in the Smith School of Chemical and Biomolecular Engineering in the College of Engineering, Cornell University.

References 

Botanical research institutes
2021 establishments in the United States
Cornell University